Jean Willem "Willy" Steveniers (born 12 December 1938) is a Belgian former professional basketball player and coach. Standing at 1.80 m (5' 11") tall, Steveniers played at the shooting guard position.

He was named the Belgian Player of the Year four times. He was named one of FIBA's 50 Greatest Players, in 1991. He is generally considered by most fans and sports journalists to have been the best Belgian basketball player of all-time. During his playing career, his nickname was, "The Emperor of Belgian Basketball".

Playing career

Club career
During his club career, Steveniers played in the Belgian League, with Zaziko Antwerpen, Racing Mechelen, Standard Liege, Eural Goldfingers (Wilrijk), Aalst, Antwerpse, and Royal Fresh Air. He is the Belgian League's all-time top scorer, with 11,870 career points scored. He won the league's championship five times, four times with Racing Mechelen, and once with Standard Liege.

With Standard Liege, he made it to the semifinals of the FIBA European Champions Cup (now called EuroLeague), in the 1968–69 season. He also won the Belgian Cup that season. He was named the Belgian Player of the Year in 1965, 1966, 1967, and 1970. He was named to the FIBA European Selection team, in 1966.

At the age of 21, he was offered an NBA contract, but he turned it down.

National team career
Steveniers was a member of the senior Belgian national basketball team. With Belgium's senior national team, he played in 54 games. He played at the 1959 EuroBasket, and at the 1961 EuroBasket.

Coaching career
After he retired from playing professional basketball, Steveniers became a basketball coach. He was D. J. Mbenga's personal youth coach.

References

External links

FIBA Profile 1
FIBA Profile 2 
FIBA Europe Profile
Willy STEVENIERS 

1938 births
Living people
Antwerpse BC players
Belgian basketball coaches
Belgian men's basketball players
Fresh Air Basketball players
Okapi Aalstar players
Point guards
R.C. Mechelen players
Shooting guards
Standard BC Liège players